Sigvard "Sigge" Löfgren (12 April 1928 – 21 April 1996), also known as Sigfrid Löfgren, was a Swedish footballer who played as a midfielder.

Club career
Löfgren started his career with Swedish Allsvenskan side Helsingborg in 1950, and garnered a reputation of being one of the best athletes in Swedish football. He moved to Italy in 1951, and was being scouted by numerous clubs before joining Lazio. After a good first season, in which he scored 7 goals from 20 games, he suffered a serious injury which kept him out of the whole 1952–53 season.

On his return from injury, Löfgren could never recapture the form he showed in his first season, and in 1955 he joined fellow Serie A side Società Polisportiva Ars et Labor, where he stayed for one season before returning to his homeland to join local side Ronneby BK.

International career
Löfgren's only senior international cap came in a 1951 friendly draw with Spain.

References

Printed sources
 In Swedish

External links
 
 

1928 births
1996 deaths
Swedish footballers
Sweden international footballers
Association football midfielders
Helsingborgs IF players
S.S. Lazio players
Allsvenskan players
Serie A players